Carasso and Galbisio are the only fraction of Bellinzona located on the west side of the Ticino river.

The patriciate of Carasso (patriciates of canton Ticino) is responsible for the management of the forest and other communitary resources of the fraction.

Carasso was a municipality of its own until 1907.

References
:it:Carasso

Former municipalities of Ticino